Deborah Gatton is an American voice actress of anime, animation and video games known for her distinctive loud voice.

Filmography

Television

Video games

References

External links 

 Official website (Deborah Gatton)

 

Living people
American voice actresses
Actresses from Burbank, California
American video game actresses
Year of birth missing (living people)
21st-century American women